St. Stanislaus Parish - designated for Polish immigrants in West Warren, Massachusetts, United States.

 Founded December 1908. It is one of the Polish-American Roman Catholic parishes in New England in the Diocese of Worcester.

Bibliography 
 
 
 
 The Official Catholic Directory in USA

External links 

 St. Stanislaus Parish -  ParishesOnline.com
 St. Stanislaus Parish - TheCatholicDirectory.com 
 Diocese of Worcester
 Parish history

Roman Catholic parishes of Diocese of Worcester
Polish-American Roman Catholic parishes in Massachusetts